Setareh'yé Djéhane was a Persian/French bilingual newspaper published from Teheran, Iran, founded in 1928. It was published daily, except on Saturdays. As of 1937, Its owner and editor-in-chief was A. G. E'tessam-Zadeh (member of parliament and French Academy laureate) and its director was A. Malecki. The newspaper was dedicated to covering politics, economics and literature.

References

1928 establishments in Iran
Bilingual newspapers
Defunct newspapers published in Iran
French-language newspapers published in Asia
Newspapers published in Tehran
Persian-language newspapers
Publications established in 1928
Publications with year of disestablishment missing